The Battle of Toppenish Creek was the first engagement of the Yakima War in Washington. Fought on October 5, 1855, a company of American soldiers, under Major Granville O. Haller,  was attacked by a band of Yakamas, under Chief Kamiakin, and compelled to retreat. The battle occurred in Yakima Valley, 113 miles northwest of Fort Walla Walla, along Toppenish Creek and was a major victory for Native American forces.

See also
 Cayuse War
 Whitman Massacre

References

Toppenish
Toppenish
Toppenish
Toppenish
Toppenish
Toppenish
Toppenish Creek
October 1855 events